Beriskan (also Romanized as Berīskān; also known as Āb Bād) is a village in Fasarud Rural District, in the Central District of Darab County, Fars Province, Iran. At the 2006 census, its population was 944, in 216 families.

References 

Populated places in Darab County